Nicrophorus funerarius may be a species of burying beetle described by Weigel in 1808.  It is not yet verified that this species is unique from other species of Nicrophorus.

References

Silphidae
Beetles of North America
Beetles described in 1808